Acleris kerincina is a species of moth of the family Tortricidae. It is found in western Sumatra at altitudes of about 3,250 meters.

The wingspan is 16–19 mm. The ground colour of the forewings is orange yellow, suffused orange and brownish with a paler blotch before the mid-costa and spotted with brown. The costa and edges of the costal blotch are grey brown and the dorsum (up to middle) and almost the complete termen is concolorous. The hindwings are whitish, tinged brown at the apex.

Etymology
The species name refers to Mount Kerinci, the type locality.

References

Moths described in 2012
kerincina
Moths of Indonesia